Pursaklar is a metropolitan district in the province of Ankara, the capital of Turkey. It became a town municipality in 1987, and a district in 2008. There are 19 neighborhoods under its administration.

Demographics

References

External links 
 Mayorship of Pursaklar (in Turkish)
 Municipality of Pursaklar (in Turkish)

Districts of Ankara Province